Rolonda Watts (born July 12, 1959) is an American actress, producer, and television and radio talk show host. She is best known for hosting the eponymous Rolonda, an internationally syndicated talk show which aired from 1994 to 1997. Watts was the on-camera announcer for Judge Joe Brown, which ended its run in 2013. She is currently the announcer for Sherri.

Early life
Watts's mother, Dr. Velma Gibson Watts, was an associate dean at Wake Forest University and her father, Roland Watts, was chairman of Winston-Salem State University's Fine Arts Department. Watts attended Salem Academy in Winston-Salem, North Carolina as a teenager. She is a graduate of Spelman College in Atlanta, where she was editor-in-chief of the school newspaper and graduated magna cum laude. In 1981, she earned a master's degree from Columbia University Graduate School of Journalism.

Career
After graduating from Columbia, Watts returned to North Carolina and began her career as a general assignment reporter at WFMY-TV  in Greensboro, North Carolina. She later worked at WNBC, where she was nominated for an Emmy, and WABC-TV in New York as an anchor of a weekly political forum and reporter. In 1987, she began working as a host of Attitudes, a talk show on Lifetime Television. The next year, she took a job on the newsmagazine Inside Edition as a senior correspondent, weekend anchor and producer. King World Productions, the syndicator of Inside Edition and also The Oprah Winfrey Show, then asked her to start her own talk show. Rolonda aired for nearly four seasons from January 17, 1994, to September 1997. Watts was also supervising producer and one of the owners of the show. In a 2003 interview with Soap Opera Digest, Watts said she folded the show rather than lose her integrity. "Audiences were saying, 'Well, that was really nice of you to be so respectful, but where's Jerry [Springer]?' We had to make a tough decision, either we go that route or we find something else to do."

After leaving her talk show behind, Watts headed to Hollywood, California to pursue a career in acting. Her first break was in 1997 when she was cast as Vivica Shaw in Sister, Sister, a role she played for six episodes. Since then Watts has had guest starring roles in dozens of television shows, including The West Wing, JAG, The District Yes, Dear, and soap operas Days of Our Lives and The Bold and the Beautiful. In 2002, Soap Opera Digest named her "Scene Stealer of the Week" for her role as the cut-throat Attorney Cameron Reese on Days of our Lives. Watts is also the CEO/president of her own production company, Watts Works Productions, which co-produced her talk show Rolonda. In 2005, she hosted Lie Detector,  a reality series for PAX-TV. That same year, she took over as announcer on Judge Joe Brown. She also appeared on Live With Regis and Kelly where she traveled cross-country as a judge for the show's "Great American Co-Host Search."

In October 2006, Watts returned to her talk-show roots. She signed with GreenStone Media, a radio network launched by feminists Gloria Steinem and Jane Fonda, to host an afternoon radio show. She hosted the show until the network's closure in August 2007. Subsequently, Watts served as announcer for the game show Temptation, which ran from September 2007 to May 2008. As of 2011, Watts is the voice of Professor Wiseman in the PBS Kids animated program Curious George, as well as voicing "Gladys" in the Nickelodeon series The Penguins of Madagascar. Watts is currently shooting two films, with five others waiting for release, including her first starring role in A Mother's Love and leading roles in Christmas Mail, House Arrest, Soul Ties, Broken Roads and 25 Hill, a film written and produced by Corbin Bernsen. In the short film Return to Babylon, Watts portrays Josephine Baker; in Defying the Stars. she plays the role of Dorothy Dandridge. She recently played the role of Betsy Holiday in Tyler Perry's first animated film Madea's Tough Love.

In between the months of June and August 2017, Rolonda begun her stand up career and was offered a radio show from CBS Radio entitled Sundays with Rolonda. Rolonda begun starting her own webseries entitled ROmance via YouTube; she also starred in Bounce TV's sitcom series, Mann & Wife as a choir director in a principal casting role.

Filmography

Film

Television

References

External links

 
 

American television talk show hosts
Actors from Winston-Salem, North Carolina
Living people
Television anchors from New York City
African-American actresses
African-American television personalities
Columbia University Graduate School of Journalism alumni
Spelman College alumni
1959 births
African-American television talk show hosts
American television actresses
American film actresses
Writers from Winston-Salem, North Carolina